Henry Thomas Liddell, 1st Earl of Ravensworth (10 March 1797 – 19 March 1878) was a British peer and Member of Parliament for several constituencies.

Liddell was the eldest son of Thomas Liddell, 1st Baron Ravensworth. He was educated at Eton and St John's College, Cambridge. In the House of Commons, he represented Northumberland from 1826 until 1830, then North Durham from 1837 to 1847, and finally Liverpool from 1853 to 1855. In 1855 he succeeded to his father's peerage and became known as Lord Ravensworth.

In Parliament, Liddell often spoke on the Tory side of debates. He supported Catholic Emancipation but was an opponent of the Reform Acts. In 1874, he was created Earl of Ravensworth and Baron Eslington. These titles passed to his son Henry upon his death. When Henry died in 1903 the earldom was inherited by his brother Atholl who died the following year.

References
Notes

Sources

Oxford Dictionary of National Biography

External links 
 
Oxford Dictionary of National Biography

1797 births
1878 deaths
Ravensworth, Henry Liddell Thomas, 1st Earl
Ravensworth, Henry Liddell Thomas, 1st Earl
Members of the Parliament of the United Kingdom for Liverpool
People educated at Eton College
Alumni of St John's College, Cambridge
UK MPs 1826–1830
UK MPs 1837–1841
UK MPs 1841–1847
UK MPs 1852–1857
UK MPs who inherited peerages
UK MPs who were granted peerages
Peers of the United Kingdom created by Queen Victoria
Barons Ravensworth